Megalobulimus ovatus is a species of air-breathing land snail, a terrestrial gastropod mollusk in the family Strophocheilidae.

This species is endemic to Brazil.

References

External links
 Landshells
 Conchology

ovatus